Dune is an original soundtrack album for the 1984 film Dune. Most of the album was composed by the rock band Toto—their first and only film score—but one track was contributed by Brian Eno, Roger Eno and Daniel Lanois. The soundtrack album was first released in November 1984. An extended version with an altered track listing was released in 1997. Both versions are currently out of print on traditional media such as CD but with the increasing popularity of download and streaming services, have gained improved exposure through such channels as iTunes and Spotify.

Background
The instrumental soundtrack was recorded by the band Toto (minus lead singer Fergie Frederiksen), accompanied by the Vienna Symphony Orchestra and the Vienna Volksoper Choir, conducted by Marty Paich, father of Toto keyboardist David Paich. "Prophecy Theme" was composed for the movie by Brian Eno, Roger Eno and Daniel Lanois. There are unverified rumors that Eno composed an entire earlier Dune soundtrack, although only "Prophecy Theme" and some incidental background music survived in the final film version.

The first release of the soundtrack contained select cues in their original film order, plus two pieces of dialogue from the movie that served as bookends for two tracks ("Prologue" and "The Floating Fat Man (The Baron)"). This first issue was released by Polydor Records. The album includes an alternative take of the "Main Title", that had not been used in the film.

An extended version containing additional cues was released in 1997 on PEG Records, an independent label division of Polygram. On this issue multiple tracks had mastering problems which resulted in audible distortion in the form of a 'wobbling' effect. Furthermore, many cues (particularly in the second half of the expanded CD) were mislabeled and placed out of film order. The album includes the film version of the "Main Title", and an original demo of the main title music.

There are several differences between the music on the two soundtrack albums and that heard in the film. For example, the end title theme, "Take My Hand", is heard on the soundtrack CDs minus the orchestration heard in the final film mix. The version of "Robot Fight" on the original soundtrack is heard in the theatrical version, while the version on the expanded CD is only heard in the extended "Alan Smithee" TV version of the film. The cues "Riding The Sandworm" (from the expanded CD) and "Dune (Desert Theme)", "Prelude (Take My Hand)", "Paul Kills Feyd" and "Final Dream" (from both soundtrack issues) are not heard in the movie, and are replaced by either repeated or alternate cues. However, the television version does restore "Paul Kills Feyd" in its original place in the movie, and "Dune (Desert Theme)", which was intended as the end title music, is replaced by "Take My Hand."

Composer James Newton Howard made his film score debut on the film, co-composing the cue "Trip to Arrakis" with Paich.

Track listing

Original Polydor release

PEG reissue

Personnel
 Steve Lukather – guitar
 David Paich – keyboards
 Steve Porcaro – keyboards
 Mike Porcaro – bass guitar, percussion
 Jeff Porcaro – drums, percussion
 Virginia Madsen – narration on "Prologue"
 Kenneth McMillan and Paul Smith – dialogue on "The Floating Fat Man (The Baron)"
 Vienna Symphony Orchestra

Production
 Tom Knox – score engineer / score mixer

References in other media 
"Main Title" was likely partially inspired by the composer's Ronald Stein's score for the horror movie The Haunted Palace (1963). Motifs featured in the "Main Title" can be heard in the following soundtracks:
 "Main Titles / Terrorist Attack" in Scrooged (1988) by Danny Elfman
 "Skeletor" in Army of Darkness (1992) by Joseph DoLuca
 "Setting the Stage","End of the Quest" in Baldur's Gate (1998) by Michael Hoenig
 "Trilogy" in Red Faction (2001) by Dan Wentz, unofficially "The Consul's Theme" in Half Life 2 Beta (1999-2004)
 "I am Lord Voldemort" scene in Harry Potter and the Chamber of Secrets (2002) by John Williams
 "Menu Theme" in Judge Dredd: Dredd vs. Death (2003) by Thomas Bible
 "Metal Battle" in Spy Kids 3: Game Over (2003) by Robert Rodriguez
 "Battle for Freedom" in Final Fantasy XII (2006) by Hitoshi Sakimoto
 "Sovereign's Theme" in Mass Effect (2007) by Jack Wall
 "The Part Where He Kills You" in Portal 2 (2011) by Mike Morasky
 "Main Theme" in The Babadook (2014) by Jed Kurzel
 "The Golden Circle" in Kingsman: The Golden Circle (2017) by Henry Jackman and Matthew Margeson
 "The New Order" by Aaron Kenny (2018)
 "Stillsuits" in Dune (2021) by Hans Zimmer

Additional notes
Catalogue: (CD) Columbia 8237702, (CD) Polydor 823770-2, (LP) Polydor 8237701, (CD) Polygram International 823770

References

External links 
 Dune at Toto99.com
 filmtracks.com Review of Toto's soundtrack
 Download preview page at Apple iTunes

Albums produced by Brian Eno
Music based on Dune (franchise)
Single-artist film soundtracks
Science fiction soundtracks
Toto (band) albums
1984 soundtrack albums
Polydor Records soundtracks